Bert Jones (born May 26, 1962) was a politician in the North Carolina General Assembly.

Honors
In 2018, Jones was listed as a Champion of the Family in the NC Values Coalition Scorecard.

Electoral history

2016

2014

2012

2010

2000

References

External links

 (campaign website)

1962 births
Living people
Republican Party members of the North Carolina House of Representatives
People from Reidsville, North Carolina
21st-century American politicians